Hoseynabad (also Romanized as Ḩoseynābād; also known as Husainābād and Khusainabad) is a village in Sonbolabad Rural District, Soltaniyeh District, Abhar County, Zanjan Province, Iran. At the 2006 census, its population was 542, in 152 families.

References 

Populated places in Abhar County